Donut Showdown is an American food-based television series on the Cooking Channel that premiered on July 3, 2013. The show was originally hosted by Danny Boome and is currently hosted by Daryn Jones. The series is produced by Architect Films.

The series pits three contestants against each other to make donuts, with the winner awarded a US$10,000 prize.

Episodes

Season 1 (2013)

Broadcast
The series premiered in America on The Cooking Channel on 3 July 2013.

Internationally, the series premiered in Australia on 14 August 2015 on LifeStyle Food in double episodes each week.

References

External links
 
 

2010s American cooking television series
2013 American television series debuts
Cooking Channel original programming
English-language television shows
2015 American television series endings